The Mullica River is a  river in southern New Jersey in the United States. The Mullica was once known as the Little Egg Harbor River.

The river provides one of the principal drainages into the Atlantic Ocean of the extensive Pinelands. Its estuary on Great Bay is considered one of the least-disturbed marine wetlands habitats in the northeastern United States.

In 2022, the Mullica River Fire consumed an estimated  of the related Wharton State Forest.

Course 
The Mullica rises in central Camden County, near Berlin, on the southeastern fringes of the New Jersey suburbs of Philadelphia. It flows generally east-southeast across the state, crossing the Wharton State Forest. It becomes brackish below the bridge at Green Bank. The watershed drained by the river and its tributaries measures approximately 568 square miles, and is composed primarily of pine forests and scrub habitat.

The estuary is crossed by the Garden State Parkway and US 9 near its mouth. The lower reaches of the river form an extensive wetlands area, which is protected on its southern bank as the Edwin B. Forsythe National Wildlife Refuge.

Wildlife 

The Mullica River is noted as a spawning ground for striped bass. Blueback herring make a spring spawning run up the river and its tributaries.  Freshwater portions are also home to healthy populations of white catfish, pickerel, white perch, crappie, white sucker, and largemouth bass.  Brackish and saltwater portions of the river are inhabited by weakfish, winter flounder, bluefish, American eel, and summer flounder. Blue claw crabs are prevalent in the lower reaches of the river and in tributaries flowing through the surrounding salt marshes.  These tidal creeks also support populations of the northern diamondback terrapin, which is listed by the federal government as a species of special concern.

The river also provides a habitat for a broad assortment of nesting and migratory birds.  Species of note include the common tern, black skimmer, laughing gull, piping plover, least tern, great black-backed gull, osprey, great egret, black-crowned night heron, clapper rail, Virginia rail, merlin, and marsh wren, among others.  Canada geese, American black ducks, mallards, tundra swans, northern pintails, and other migratory birds are often observed in the river estuary.

Name 
The river is named after Eric Pålsson Mullica, an early Finnish settler born in 1636 who founded a homestead on the river after moving there from the vicinity of Philadelphia. The settlement was located about 15 miles (24 km) upstream from the mouth near present-day Lower Bank. For many years it was known as the Little Egg Harbor River ('Little' to disambiguate it from the Great Egg Harbor River to its south); before European colonization, the Lenape called it the Amintonck.

Tributaries 

Judies Creek
Roundabout Creek
Ballanger Creek
Big Graveling Creek
Nacote Creek
Bass River
Wading River
Big Creek
Fence Creek
Jerry Creek
Turtle Creek
Tar Kiln Branch
Teal Creek
Landing Creek
Becky Lane Creek
Stump Creek
Pine Creek
Cedar Creek
Negro Creek
Little Bull Creek
Bull Creek
Hatch's Creek
First Branch
Batsto River
Nescochague Creek
Sleeper Branch
Alquatka Branch

See also 
List of New Jersey rivers
Mullica Hill, New Jersey, a census-designated place located within Harrison Township, New Jersey, in Gloucester County
Mullica Township, New Jersey, a township in Atlantic County, New Jersey

References

External links 

Mullica River National Estuarine Research Reserve
Origin of the Name
Pirates of the Mullica during the American Revolution
U.S. Geological Survey: NJ stream gaging stations

 
Rivers of Camden County, New Jersey
Rivers in the Pine Barrens (New Jersey)
Rivers of New Jersey
Rivers of Atlantic County, New Jersey